William David Burbach (August 22, 1947 – July 20, 2022) was an American Major League Baseball pitcher who played for the New York Yankees from 1969 to 1971. He was born in Dickeyville, Wisconsin, and attended Iowa University.

The Yankees selected Burbach in the first round, 19th pick of the 1965 MLB Draft. He spent four years in the Minor Leagues before joining the big team.

Burbach posted a 6–11 record with a 4.48 ERA in 37 pitching appearances for the Yankees, 28 of them starts including a shutout. Afterwards, he pitched in the Baltimore Orioles and Minnesota Twins Minor League systems in 1971 and 1972.

Overall, Burbach went 38–54 with a 3.69 ERA in 162 minor league games. In between, he played winter ball with the Cardenales de Lara club of the Venezuelan League in the 1971–72 season.

Burbach died July 20, 2022, at Sycamore Shoals Hospital in Elizabethton, Tennessee.

References

External links

1947 births
2022 deaths
Baseball players from Wisconsin
Binghamton Triplets players
Cardenales de Lara players
American expatriate baseball players in Venezuela
Greensboro Yankees players
Iowa Hawkeyes baseball players
Johnson City Yankees players
Major League Baseball pitchers
New York Yankees players
People from Grant County, Wisconsin
Rochester Red Wings players
Syracuse Chiefs players
Tacoma Twins players